Magdalo Mussio (1925 – 12 August 2006) was an Italian author, artist, animator and editor.

A native of the Tuscany town of Volterra, Magdalo Mussio served during the 1960s as the editor of several Italian cultural publications, including Marcatrè and was widely throughout his country's art gallery circuit. He was also the creative artist behind a number of animated films, including Reale dissoluto, I ragazzi di Theresi, Il potere del drago and Umanomeno and published several books detailing his life and work and uniting his own creative writings with what has been described as an archaeology of images in a sweetly melancholic mixture. Among his best-known titles are In practica, Praticabili per memoria concreta and Il fastidio delle parole.

Mussio died after a lengthy illness in the year of his 81st birthday.

Further reading

 

1925 births
2006 deaths
People from the Province of Pisa
Italian male writers
Italian experimental filmmakers
Italian animators
Italian editors
Date of birth missing
Place of death missing
Italian magazine editors